Juno and the Paycock is a 1930 British tragicomedy film written and directed by Alfred Hitchcock, and starring Barry Fitzgerald, Maire O'Neill, Edward Chapman and Sara Allgood.

The film was based on the successful 1924 play of the same name by Seán O'Casey.

Plot
Barry Fitzgerald, who played Captain Jack Boyle in the original stage production, appears as an orator in the first scene, but has no other role. In the slums of Dublin during the Irish Civil War, Captain Boyle (Edward Chapman) lives in a two-room tenement flat with his wife Juno (Sara Allgood) and their two adult children Mary (Kathleen O'Regan) and Johnny (John Laurie). Juno has dubbed her husband "the Paycock" because she thinks him as useless and vain as a peacock. Juno works while the Captain loafs around the flat when not drinking up the family's meagre finances at the neighbourhood pub.

Daughter Mary has a job but is on strike against the victimisation of a co-worker. Son Johnny has become a semi-invalid after losing an arm and severely injuring his hip in a fight with the Black and Tans during the Irish War of Independence. Although Johnny has taken the Anti-Treaty side during the continuing Irish Civil War, he has recently turned in a fellow Irish Republican Army (IRA) member to the Irish Free State police who subsequently kill him. The Paycock tells his friend Joxer (Sidney Morgan) of his disgust at the informer, unaware that his son was responsible. The IRA suspect Johnny and order him to report to them for questioning; he refuses, protesting that his wounds show he has done his bit for Ireland.

Mary is courted by Jerry Devine (Dave Morris), whom she leaves for Charlie Bentham (John Longden) who whisks her away after telling Mary's family the Captain is to receive an inheritance. The elated Captain borrows money against the (as yet un-received) inheritance and spends it freely on new furniture and a gramophone. Family friends are invited to an impromptu party at the once shabby tenement.

The Captain soon learns the inheritance has been lost because Bentham made an error in drafting the will. The Captain keeps the bad news a secret until creditors show up. Even Joxer turns on the Captain and gleefully spreads the news of the nonexistent inheritance to creditors. The furniture store repossesses the furniture. The tailor demands money for new clothes. Pub owner Mrs. Madigan (Maire O'Neill) takes the Victrola to cover the Captain's bar tab.

The worst is yet to come, however. Mary reveals that she has shamed the family by becoming pregnant by Charles, who has disappeared after his blunder was discovered. Her former fiancé Jerry proclaims his love for Mary and offers to marry her until he learns of her pregnancy. While his parents are absent dealing with the situation, Johnny is arrested by the IRA and his body is later found riddled with bullets. Realising that their family has been destroyed, Mary declares, "It's true. There is no God." Although completely shattered, Juno shushes her daughter, saying that they will need both Christ and the Blessed Virgin to deal with their grief. Alone, however, she laments her son's fate before the religious statues in the family's empty tenement, deciding that Boyle will remain useless, and leaves with Mary.

Cast
Maire O'Neill as Maisie Madigan
Edward Chapman as Captain Boyle
Sidney Morgan as "Joxer" Daly
Sara Allgood as Mrs Boyle, "Juno"
John Laurie as Johnny Boyle
Dave Morris as Jerry Devine
Kathleen O'Regan as Mary Boyle
John Longden as Charles Bentham
Dennis Wyndham as The Mobiliser
Barry Fitzgerald as The Orator

Production
The film was based on the successful play Juno and the Paycock by Seán O'Casey. Hitchcock filmed a faithful reproduction of the play using few of the directorial touches he had incorporated in his previous films. Instead he often asked cinematographer Jack Cox to hold the camera for long single shots. He was eager to have a scene set outside the flat inserted into the film, and after permission from O'Casey, added a pub scene. O'Casey made quite an impression on Hitchcock, and was the inspiration for the prophet of doom in the diner in The Birds.

Sara Allgood reprised her role as Juno from the play. Barry Fitzgerald made his film debut. The tailor Mr Kelly, who repossesses Captain Boyle's new clothes (bought on hire-purchase), is portrayed by a Jewish actor and given a strong Germanic accent, although there is no indication in the original play that the character (there called Nugent) is anything other than an Irish Gentile. It has been alleged that this plays up to the stereotype of Jews as alien usurers, and 'reading' the language used by the tailor in the film – "I should vorry vot you dress yourself in? Go ahead, jump in a pillowslip!" – has obviously been reworked to sound Jewish compared to Nugent in O'Casey's play: "What do I care what you dhress yourself in ? You can put yourself in a bolsther cover, if you like."

Similarly, the songs in the film are deliberately the kind of fake-Irish music hall ones then popular in America, such as If You're Irish, Come Into the Parlour, where in O'Casey's original their meaning is other; the words of She is Far from the Land, Thomas Moore's plangent song in memory of his close friend Robert Emmet, another martyr of an earlier revolution, and his lover Sarah Curran.

There are many other differences: in the film it is the daughter who scolds the mother about extravagance based on her lover's meretricious promises, while in the play Juno warns her husband. In the film Joxer is introduced in effect as a secret Fenian; in the play he's a pointless drunk with no political connection.

Copyright and home video status
The original negative of the film is held in the BFI National Archive but it has never received a full restoration.

Like Hitchcock's other British films, all of which are copyrighted worldwide, Juno and the Paycock has been heavily bootlegged on home video. Despite this, licensed releases have appeared on DVD from Film First in the UK and Universal in France.

References

External links
 
 
 
 
 Alfred Hitchcock Collectors’ Guide: Juno and the Paycock at Brenton Film

1930 films
1930 drama films
Tragicomedy films
British black-and-white films
British drama films
Films shot at British International Pictures Studios
British films based on plays
Films based on works by Seán O'Casey
Films directed by Alfred Hitchcock
Films set in Dublin (city)
Irish Civil War films
Films set in 1922
1930s English-language films
1930s British films